Hurley Burley (born 1895) was an American Thoroughbred race horse. Her breeder and owner was Edward Corrigan who raced out of the old Washington Park Race Track in Chicago, Illinois. Known as the "stormy petrel" of the American Turf, he was the one of the most powerful men in Midwestern racing. Corrigan campaigned the great filly Modesty, winner of the 1884 Kentucky Oaks, as well as building Hawthorne Race Course near Chicago.

Hurley Burley was birthed by Riley, who had won the 1890 Kentucky Derby for Corrigan and was a son of the great stallion Longfellow. (Riley was originally called "Shortfellow.") Her dam was Helter Skelter, a good racing mare also running under the Corrigan colors.

Corrigan raced Hurley Burley as a selling plater, meaning she competed only in claiming races.  As a claimer, she could be bought by a trainer right out of the race.  In1898, Corrigan claimed a horse, Lucky Dog, the Hall of Fame trainer Sam Hildreth was running.  Miffed at the loss, Hildreth retaliated by claiming Corrigan's Hurley Burley for $1,500. His claim wasn't merely to get back at Corrigan; he'd seen something in the chestnut plater.

Under Hildreth's colors, Hurley Burley stepped up in class in the racing world. She won nine of her thirteen starts for him, set a Washington Park track record for six furlongs and also one for one mile and twenty yards.

Lew Fields and his theatrical partner Joe Weber liked the increasingly popular filly's name, so asked Hildreth if they could use it for a new musical. They liked the name of her dam, Helter Skelter, as well, so they used that too.

When she retired from the track, Hildreth sold her for $10,000 to William Collins Whitney. As a broodmare, Hurley Burley was as good as she was a racehorse. Her best foal was the 1906 Belmont Stakes winner Burgomaster, by the Whitney-owned stallion Hamburg. He was also the American Horse of the Year in 1906.

External links
Hurley Burley's pedigree

References

1895 racehorse births
Racehorses bred in the United States
Racehorses trained in the United States
Thoroughbred family 2-h